King Hyo was the 8th king of Mahan confederacy. He reigned from 58 BCE to 33 BCE. His true name was Hyo. He was succeeded by Gye of Samhan (Gye Wang).

References

See also 
 List of Korean monarchs
 History of Korea

Monarchs of the Mahan confederacy
1st-century BC Korean people